The Boeing Phantom Badger, or simply the Badger, is a combat support vehicle built by Boeing, in collaboration with MSI Defense Solutions. Designed for transport inside the V-22 Osprey, the Badger is notable for its size and versatility. Unlike previous vehicles and competing offers, the Badger's design is such that it avoids non-standard equipment, instead using already available hardware for construction. Although officially certified for use with United States Navy  aircraft, the Badger is also used by the United States Air Force as well as United States Marine Corps special operations.

The Badger is the second vehicle to fit into the MV-22 after the M1161 Growler ―  the Internally Transportable Light Strike Vehicle (ITV-LSV) also designed specifically for use with the V-22 Osprey tiltrotor aircraft.

Design
The Badger is designed with mission-specific rear modules that are attached with six bolts at six connection points that can be interchanged on the field in 30 minutes or less. Interchangeable modular mission capabilities include reconnaissance, combat search and rescue, casualty transport and explosive ordnance disposal in addition to mounts for weapons like a .50-caliber machine gun and 40mm automatic grenade launcher.

References

External links
 Boeing Phantom Badger

All-wheel-drive vehicles
Military trucks of the United States
Off-road vehicles
Military vehicles introduced in the 2010s
Military light utility vehicles
Post–Cold War armored fighting vehicles of the United States